The 2018 Liga 3 West Sumatra is a qualifying round for the national round of 2018 Liga 3. Batang Anai F.C., the winner of the 2017 Liga 3 West Sumatra are the defending champions. The competition will begin on June 30, 2018.

Format
In this competition, 19 teams are divided into 3 groups of five and 1 groups of four. The two best teams are through to knockout stage. The winner will represent West Sumatra in national round of 2018 Liga 3.

Teams
There are initially 19 clubs which will participate the league in this season..

First round
This stage scheduled starts on 02 July 2018.

Group A
 All matches will be held at Padang Pariaman

Group B
 All matches will be held at Lima Puluh Kota

Group C
 All matches will be held at Agam

Group D
 All matches will be held at Sijunjung

Second round
This stage scheduled starts on 18 July 2018.

Group E

Group F

Final Round
This stage scheduled starts on 27 July 2018.

References 

2018 in Indonesian football
Seasons in Asian third tier association football leagues